Tocsajota (possibly from Aymara thujsaña to smell, quta lake "smelling lake") is a lake in the Andes of Peru at a mountain of the same name. It is located in the Puno Region, Carabaya Province, Macusani District. Tocsajota lies southeast of the larger lake named Saytajota and southwest of the mountain Tocsajota.

References

Lakes of Peru
Lakes of Puno Region
Mountains of Puno Region
Mountains of Peru